Clowry may refer to:

Clowry, Michigan, a community in the United States
Matt Clowry, an Australian basketball player